Black Forest is an inner southern suburb of Adelaide, South Australia. It is located in the City of Unley, bounded by the Glenelg tram line (north-west), the Seaford railway line (south-east), South Road (west) and East Avenue (east).

History
"A dense area of bush known as the Black Forest ('Kertaweeta' in Kuarna) once covered the Unley region of the Adelaide Plains. The woodland forest was a mix of grey-box, blue gum, red gum, native pines and sheoak trees, with grass trees, native grasses and orchids. These plants had deep roots that held the soil together and the plant debris that fell on the earth decomposed releasing nutrients into the soil."

In the early years of colonial settlement, the Black Forest was supposedly "frequented by bush rangers and cattle thieves".

There have been three Post Offices named Black Forest: the first opened on 1 September 1899 and was renamed Glandore in 1915, the second opened on 10 November 1947 and was renamed Clarence Park West in 1966, and the third, located on South Road between Byron and Cowper Roads, opened on 8 January 1996.

Demographics

The 2006 Census by the Australian Bureau of Statistics counted 1,846 persons in Black Forest on census night. Of these, 47.2% were male and 52.8% were female.

The majority of residents (79.0%) are of Australian birth, with other common census responses being England (3.1%) and Greece (2.3%).

Facilities and attractions

Schools
Black Forest Primary School opened in 1919. It is located off South Road and School Avenue, between Forest Avenue and Addison Road. The east end of the school grounds are adjacent to the "Forest Avenue Reserve".

Parks
The Forest Avenue Reserve is located on Forest Avenue near the centre of the suburb. There is another small park, the Princess Margaret Playground, at the east end of Byron Road.

Uniting Church History Centre
The Uniting Church History Centre is based in the former Church of Christ building on East Avenue.

Community Centre
The Clarence Park Community Centre is located in the Institute Building and surrounding buildings on the corner of East Avenue and Canterbury Terrace. The centre includes a childcare facility and a men's shed.

Transport

Roads
Black Forest is serviced by South Road, and to a lesser degree by East Avenue.

Public transport
Black Forest is serviced by three tram stops, two train stations and buses on East Avenue and South Road. All services are run by the Adelaide Metro.

See also
List of Adelaide suburbs

References

External links

Suburbs of Adelaide
Populated places established in 1850